Matthew, Mathew, Matt, Mat or Matty Dawson may refer to:

 Matt Dawson (born 1972), English rugby union player 
 Matty Dawson (born 1990), English rugby league player 
 Matt Dawson (field hockey) (born 1994), Australian field hockey player 
 Matt Dawson (astronomer), British-born astronomer living in Luxembourg who discovered some minor planets including Mattdawson. 
 Mathew Dawson (1820–1898), British racehorse trainer